Brandon Patton is an American game designer and musician.

Games

Game Design 
 Mycology (board game, in-development)
 Super PACS: The Game of Politics About the Game of Politics (2016, TableTip Games)
 Healing Blade: Defenders of Soma (2016, Nerdcore Medical)
 Occam's Razor: The Diagnostician's Dilemma (2013, Nerdcore Medical)

Music

Awards 
 Winner of the Vox Populi for Best Story Song of 2009 (for "Mixed-Up Modern Family") by the 9th Annual Independent Music Awards,
 2009 Finalist in the USA Songwriting Competition in the Rock / Alternative category.
 Featured on NPR's song of the day Oct. 8, 2009.
 "Top Music Artist" at the 2005 Temecula Film and Music Festival. 
 The album Should Confusion was a finalist for "Album of the Year" in the 2004 Independent Music Awards. 
 Finalist in the 2004 Newport Folk Festival New Talent Showcase.

Solo albums 
 How I Allegedly Bit a Man in Gloucestershire (2011)
 Underhill Downs (2009)
 Should Confusion (2004)
 Nocturnal (1997)

Other albums 
 Jukebox Stories, The Official Bootleg (2008)
 three against four, Hey Sparkle Eyes (2002)
 three against four, Some of Us Are Here (1998)

Compilations featuring Patton 
 Nerdcore Rising: Music From the Motion Picture (2008)
 Indie Pop Cares A lot (2005)
 Temecula Valley International Film & Music Festival 2005 Compilation (2005)
 The WSVNRadio Hall of Fame, Vol. 14 (2004)
 Oasis Acoustic Vol. 47 (2004) note: due to a printing error, he is listed only as Brandon

Music festival appearances 
 SXSW Music Festival (2012)
 Truck America (2010)
 Heart of Texas Quadruple Bypass Music Festival (2008)
 Newport Folk Festival New Talent Showcase (2005)
 Temecula Film and Music Festival (2005)
 NXNE Toronto (2005)

Musical groups 
 MC Frontalot (2006–2016)
 Futureboy
 Jonathan Coulton
 The Famous
 MC Lars
 Steve Songs
 Solea
 three against four (1997-2000)

Theater and film

Theater 
 Jukebox Stories 3: The Secrets of Forking (2013, performer)
 Jukebox Stories 2: The Case of the Creamy Foam (2008, performer)
 Love Sucks! A Punk Rock Musical (2007, composer)
 Jukebox Stories (2006,2007, performer)
 The AtrainPlays (2005–2007, composer)
 Young Zombies in Love (2004, bassist)

Film 
 Remedy (2013) background music
 The Muslims Are Coming (2012) background music
 Nerdcore Rising (2008) as himself

References

External links

American pop musicians
American rock musicians
American multi-instrumentalists
Living people
Wesleyan University alumni
Year of birth missing (living people)